Janjgir Naila railway station is the railway station for Janjgir Naila city, the district headquarters of Janjgir-Champa district, Chhattisgarh, India. Its code is NIA. The station has four platforms which are not well sheltered. The station is on the Tatanagar–Bilaspur section of Howrah–Nagpur–Mumbai line with daily connections to Mumbai, Kolkata, Pune, Nagpur, Puri, Visakhapatnam Tatanagar Raipur and Ahmedabad. The station is 6 km from Janjgir collectorate.

Major trains 
The following trains run from Janjgir Naila railway station:
 Ahmedabad–Howrah SF Express 
 Bilaspur–Tatanagar Passenger
 Bilaspur–Gevra Road Passenger (unreserved)
 Bilaspur–Gevra Road MEMU
 Bilaspur–Jharsuguda Passenger (unreserved)
 Bilaspur–Raigarh MEMU
 Bilaspur–Raigarh MEMU
 Gondia–Jharsuguda Passenger (unreserved)
 Gondia–Raigarh Jan Shatabdi Express
 Itwari–Tatanagar Jn Passenger
 Kalinga Utkal Express
 Korba–Raipur MEMU
 Korba–Thiruvananthapuram Central SF Express 
 Korba–Visakhapatnam Express
 Shalimar–Lokmanya Tilak Terminus Express
 Wainganga SF Express

References

Railway stations in Janjgir-Champa district
Bilaspur railway division